Khosrow Doroodian (born 1952) is an academic. 

Doroodian received his bachelor and master's degrees in economics from Pahlavi University (now Shiraz University).  He obtained his Ph.D. in economics from the University of Oregon in 1981. His area of specialization is International Economics. After graduation, he taught economic courses at Portland State University as an adjunct Professor for one year. He joined Ohio University in 1982. He has been nominated two times for the Presidential Teaching Award and has taught courses in both undergraduate and graduate levels (including MBA economics and statistic courses). He has published numerous scholarly articles in journals (including Review of Economics and Statistics, IMF Staff Paper, Weltwirtschaftliches Archiv, Review of Industrial Organization, Economics Letters, and Economic Development and Cultural Change) and has made numerous presentations in various professional conferences.  Since 1991, he has been the Director of Graduate Programs at Ohio University. He designed a new master's degree (Master of Financial Economics) based on the CFA curriculum. In 2000, this new master ‘program was initially offered on the main campus and in 2004, the same program was offered to working professionals in Pickerington, Ohio. In October 2012, Ohio University’s Masters in Financial Economics (MFE) program was endorsed by the CFA Institute University Recognition Program.

References

1952 births
Living people
Place of birth missing (living people)
University of Oregon alumni
Ohio University faculty
Portland State University faculty